The Daniel Trabue House, at 299 Jamestown St. in Columbia, Kentucky, was built in 1823.  It was listed on the National Register of Historic Places in 1974.

It was home of Daniel Trabue, famous for his early account of life in Kentucky, Westward into Kentucky.

The original portion of the house was a two-room brick building, with a full attic above, within what is now the southwest corner of the house.

References

National Register of Historic Places in Adair County, Kentucky
Buildings and structures completed in 1823
1823 establishments in Kentucky
Columbia, Kentucky